Ann Walker or Anne Walker may refer to:

Ann Walker (landowner) (1803–1854), Yorkshire landowner, partner of Anne Lister
Anne Walker (architectural historian) (born 1973), American architectural historian and author
Anne Walker (artist) (born 1933), painter and printmaker
Anne Walker (astronomer) (1864–?), British astronomer
Anne Weightman Walker (1844–1932), American philanthropist

See also
Annie Walker (disambiguation)
Anna Walker (disambiguation)
Walker (surname)